The Codex Mexicanus is an early colonial Mexican pictorial manuscript.

The Codex can be divided into several sections:
The saints, the European calendar and zodiac.
The Aztec calendar.
Accounts in the Aztec pictographic writing system.
A family tree of the rulers of Mexico.
The history of the Mexica from their departure from Aztlan.
Colonial history.
Two Christian scenes: the Temptation of Christ and the Adoration.
A tonalamatl. This last section is incomplete.

It is currently held in the Bibliothèque Nationale, Paris.

See also 
 Aztec codices
 Codex Vaticanus B

References

External links
 High Definition scans of the codex at the French National Library

 
Codices
Manuscripts by area
A
16th century in the Aztec civilization
16th century in Mexico
16th century in New Spain
Pictograms
Astrological texts
Mexicanus
Bibliothèque nationale de France collections